Morningside is a suburb of Durban, KwaZulu-Natal, South Africa.

Location
Its neighboring suburbs are Puntans Hill to the west, Essenwood to the south-west, Windermere to the south and Stamford Hill to the east.

Politics
Morningside is classed under the Ward 27 in terms of IEC's demarcation which includes Essenwood, Windermere and Stamford Hill. 

The elected Councillor for this Ward is Ernest Smith who represents the area in the eThekwini Council and currently serves on the Human Settlements and Infrastructure Committee. Previously, Councillor Ernest Smith served on the Parks, Recreation and Culture portfolio's which is a part of Community Services Committee for Ethekwini Municiplaity. 

The Parks, Recreation and Culture portfolio is primarily tasked with the maintenance of municipal facilities such as Parks, Swimming Pools, Beaches, Cemeteries, Play lots and Stadia with the eThekwini Metro. 

The Human Settlements and Infrastructure committee primarily deals with the Durban Solid Waste services, Electricity infrastructure, Water and Sanitation infrastructure, Roads and Storm water, building developments, human settlements (informal/formal)as well as other issues that fall into the eThekwini Municipality under its ambit.

Previously, the Ward Councillor for Ward 27 was Martin Meyer who currently serves as a Member of the Provincial Legislature of KwaZulu-Natal and serves as spokesperson for the Democratic Alliance on Cooperative Governance and Traditional Affairs (CoGTA). Currently, MPL Meyer is Member at Cooperative Governance and Traditional Affairs (CoGTA) (Kwazulu-Natal-Provincial-Legislature-Committee).

Layout and attractions
The Morningside area contains classical examples of large Edwardian and Victorian style homes with tin roofs and wide verandas, including the State President's residence (when at home). Around Florida Road in the suburb's southwest is a nightlife area consisting of shops, restaurants, pubs and bistros. It is the closest residential suburb to the Moses Mabhida Stadium (in Stamford Hill), which was completed in 2009 on the grounds of the Kings Park Sports Ground.

Education
 Kenmore Primary School
 Livingstone Primary School
 Morningside Primary School
 Clifton Preparatory School

Facilities
 Parks and gardens
 Burman Bush
 Baden Powell Scouts Site
 Helen Gibling Gardens
 Westgate Gardens
 Jameson Park and Rose Garden
 Mitchell Park
 Windsor Park

 Other
 Florida Road Post Office
 Library (adjacent to Kenmore Primary School)
 Motor Licensing Office
 Morningside Sports Club
 Berea Police Station
 Innes Road Jamaat Khaana
 Consulates
 Belgium
 Chile
 Madagascar
 Thailand

 Churches
 Lambert Road Baptist Church
 http://nazarene.org  Morningside Community Church (MCC- Rev. Dr. Gabriel J Benjiman)

References

Sources

External links
 Local online guide

Suburbs of Durban